The 1933 Santa Barbara State Roadrunners football team represented Santa Barbara State College—now known as the University of California, Santa Barbara—as a member of the Southern California Conference (SCC) during the 1933 college football season. Led by sixth-year head coach Harold Davis, Santa Barbara State compiled an overall record of 1–8 with a mark of 1–6 in conference play, placing last out of eight teams in the SCC. Overall, the team was outscored by its opponents 112 to 12 for the season. The Roadrunners were shutout seven times and failed to score more than a touchdown in all nine games. Santa Barbara State played home games at Peabody Stadium in Santa Barbara, California.

Schedule

Notes

References

Santa Barbara State
UC Santa Barbara Gauchos football seasons
Santa Barbara State Roadrunners football